Dickinson is a town in Franklin County, New York, United States. The population was 823 at the 2010 census. The town was named after Philemon Dickinson,  a brigadier general of the New Jersey militia during the American Revolutionary War. 

Dickinson is on the western border of Franklin County, southwest of Malone and east of Potsdam.

History

The name originally proposed for the area was "Annastown", after the daughter of a local landowner; but another influential landowner, Jonathan Dayton, prevailed in naming the town after his friend and fellow member of congress Philemon Dickinson.

The town of Dickinson was formed from the town of Malone in 1809. In 1812, part of Dickinson was used to form the town of Bangor. The creation of the towns of Moira in 1828 and Waverly in 1880 cost Dickinson more territory.

In 1843, conversions to the Mormon religion and migration westward took place in the town, due to relatives of a Mormon apostle living there.

Geography

The western town line is the border of St. Lawrence County. The town is located along the northern edge of the Adirondacks.

New York State Route 11B is an east-west highway.

Demographics

As of the census of 2000, there were 739 people, 293 households, and 217 families residing in the town.  The population density was 16.7 people per square mile (6.4/km2).  There were 424 housing units at an average density of 9.6 per square mile (3.7/km2).  The racial makeup of the town was 97.56% White, 0.41% African American, 1.22% Native American, 0.14% Asian, and 0.68% from two or more races. Hispanic or Latino of any race were 0.41% of the population.

There were 293 households, out of which 29.7% had children under the age of 18 living with them, 57.7% were married couples living together, 8.9% had a female householder with no husband present, and 25.9% were non-families. 20.1% of all households were made up of individuals, and 8.2% had someone living alone who was 65 years of age or older.  The average household size was 2.52 and the average family size was 2.88.

In the town, the population was spread out, with 24.6% under the age of 18, 6.5% from 18 to 24, 27.3% from 25 to 44, 26.4% from 45 to 64, and 15.2% who were 65 years of age or older.  The median age was 39 years. For every 100 females, there were 107.0 males.  For every 100 females age 18 and over, there were 101.8 males.

The median income for a household in the town was $31,711, and the median income for a family was $34,875. Males had a median income of $27,083 versus $22,039 for females. The per capita income for the town was $15,701.  About 11.2% of families and 16.5% of the population were below the poverty line, including 30.1% of those under age 18 and 15.4% of those age 65 or over.

Communities and locations in Dickinson 
Alburg – A hamlet on the northern town line, west of Irish Corners.
Deer River – A stream flowing out the western town line.
Dickinson – A hamlet on NY-11B at the junction of County Road 5.  It was formerly called Harwoods Corners.
Dickinson Center – A hamlet south of Dickinson on County Road 5. Located near Dickinson Center is the Hastings Farmstead, listed on the National Register of Historic Places in 2007.
East Dickinson – A hamlet in the northeastern corner of the town on NY-11B.
Irish Corners – A hamlet on the northern town line.

Notable person
Rufus E. Brown, Vermont Attorney General

References

External links
 Town of Dickinson, NY "under construction"
 Early Dickinson history

1809 establishments in New York (state)
Populated places established in 1809
Towns in Franklin County, New York